Shamshad Media Network is based in Afghanistan and Dubai. Shamshad Media Network is a private and an Independent network based in Afghanistan which began transmission in 2005.

Shamshad Media Network was established to represent the Voice of common Afghan man, Women and Children, without compromising the traditional values and culture that we are extremely proud of. At present Shamshad Media Network is at the forefront of the Afghan media Landscape. Shamshad Media Network is providing, News, current political affairs, educational TV shows, Family Dramas, Musical shows, women empowerment, entertainment, sport and commercial programs. We reach our audience in districts and provinces that are often ignored by our competitors.  With the love and support of our audiences in Afghanistan and abroad we are confident  That SRTN will continue to provide Educational, Engaging and Inspirational Entertainment for years.

Shamshad's broadcast area covers a large portion of the country where ethnic Pashtuns live and also covering isolated areas. Shamshad programs are mainly (85%) in Pashto language providing educational TV shows, news, family dramas, musical shows, comedy programs, children's game shows, women empowerment programs, Islamic educational programs, political and current affairs programs, entertainment programs, sports programs, criminal incidents programs and entertaining programs to both local areas of Afghanistan as well as other countries via satellite, IPTV and local transmitters.

Profile 

Over the years Shamshad TV has grown from television to building a media network, encompassing a Shamshad Radio, Shamshad News and web presence. With extensive experience in radio and television production, live telecasts, news and current affairs programming, film and drama production, dubbing and various post-production services and broadcasting.  Based on the broadcast and intelligence research in Afghanistan by the corporate research firm in tune broadcast and media intelligence, Shamshad TV has become one of the most popular Afghan TV channels among commercial clients due to its reach among audiences across all provinces, despite ethnic differences. We have one of the highest shares of TV advertising spots from telecom and FMCG clients, because of our popularity and viewership rate. Shamshad Radio, the latest addition to our media network, is one of the top three radio channels in Afghanistan.  With a state-of-the-art studio facility for production of all television and radio programs, documentaries, featured films, ad-films, television dramas, music videos, news and current affairs programmes, we have all that it takes to fulfill our client’s media and communication needs. We have full field capacity in mobile cinema and off-site broadcasting. Since 2005, SMN has been the representative for the voices of the Pashtun community throughout Afghanistan and globally. The main goal of SMN, through its programming was to provide a forum for balanced and rational discussions, debates and dialogues for the Pashtun community in an effort to reach out to them, streamline them to the mainstream so that they do not feel neglected or marginalized, and most importantly, to neutralize extremist voices attempting to rally support in the Pashtun-dominated provinces.

Programmes

Shamshad Media Network most programs are produced in house by our professional and versatile staff and due to our expertise in production has made SMN a leading media network in providing quality programs in entertainment, music, dramas, comedy, Islamic programs, women empowering and awareness, educational programs for kids and live musical concerts.

Sports
SMN has been the pioneer in introducing the sports in Afghanistan, and partnership with the Afghanistan Cricket Board has been successful in promoting the sport all over the country. 
SMN broadcast all national and international cricket tournaments for our viewers.

News and current affairs
SMN has state-of-the-art newsroom and is designed to meet the present time challenges and dynamic news environment. SMN powerful news production system has made it different from its competitors in providing the quality news from Afghanistan, region and around the world. Our reporters are based in 30 provinces of Afghanistan, Khyber Pakhtunkhwa, Quetta Pakistan, United Arab Emirates, has placed SRTN in a row of more trusted source of news providers. Our news covers national, regional and international issues happening around the globe. 
The news is only the first rough draft of history and we are the first to discover it.

Coverage

Shamshad TV installed the highest towers to cover most remote districts around the country, especially in the south. Shamshad currently provides free-to-air services to viewers in Kabul, Logar, Kapisa, Parwan, Wardak, Ningrahar, Laghman, Balkh (Mazar-e-Sharif), Paktia, Khost, Kundoz, Heart, Kandahar, Helmand, Kunar, Baghlan, Ghazni, Nimroz, Farah, Zabul, Badakhshan and other province. Beside (free to air service) the main cities are also covered by cable operators. New transmitters have been installed in Speen Boldak and Turkham for terrestrial coverage across border in the tribal area. Furthermore, 90% in Pakhtunkhwa and Baluchistan are covered by cable operators.

Shamshad Radio
Shamshad Radio is a part of Shamshad SMN and is one of the major-market broadcast media operators in the Afghanistan and the undisputed leader in news and sports radio. And in Pashto language Radio industry,
It is by quit long the leader in the Afghan market, producing original audio, live events and exclusive programming broadcast via on-air, online and mobile platforms. Shamshad Radio started its operation on 1\2\2013 and in few moths was able to lead the market due to the quality of its programs and a part of Shamshad TV & Radio Network, which is the lead Pashto channel in Afghanistan, Radio was having a good brand name on its start. Shamshad Radio reaches more than 25 million consumers nationwide each week. Shamshad Radio distributes its programming via FM and HD radio stations, Radio.com and Shamshad Local Digital Media apps, making engaging with audiences easier than ever before. Shamshad Radio is distributing its program in Afghanistan to 30 provinces on FM 103.4FM\92.6FM and 92, 1FM and Shamshad Radio in webpage WWW.SHAMSAHDFM.COM/LIVE

SMN (Shamshad Media Network) Covered by:
 Terrestrial (80%)
 Cable Operator Major Cities
 Satellite 57 Countries 
 Live Steam Major Cities
 IPTV World Wide
 Social Medial World Wide

Shamshad TV programs

Shamshad translates different dramas from Turkish; a fight drama against terrorism Sefket Tape (Dare Morchal), Team One (Shaheen), Mirna and Khalil (Mirna ao khalil), Iki Dunya Anasinda (Sahra), Yeni Gelin (Nawy) and various other drama series.

Shamshad also translates many drama series from Hindi; Karal Bagh (Karal bagh) a family issues based story, a love story based drama series Qabool Hai (Salgai), Be Had (Junoon) and Koch Rang Peyar ke (Da meni rang) a family-based love story drama.

Shamshad produces its own programs like Roon Sahar (morning show inviting different peoples from society to discuss social and political issues with them), Jor pa Khair (local music), Takkan (comedy program), cooking show, in Ghazal shpa (music show) inviting different musicians from all over the country, Khaza ao Tolana (special program for women asking about their life and working area), Tawda bahsona (a current affair show on daily basis) Deni Larkhowany (inviting Islamic scholars to discuss different issues and give solution to that problems) and different other programs.

Shamshad Film Production launched the first Full HD Pashto Created drama series Sola and Seyal (Sola ao seyal) around the world.

Logo
Shamshad Media Network logo is a decorative representation of the network's name written using Pashto. It was selected by the founder, Fazel Karim Fazel. It's the combination of two SS and three dots on the top, that represent Sheen in Pashto, and the two SS are Sham Shad.

Attacks
On 7 November 2017, the Shamshad Media was attacked by armed gunmen and suicide bombers. A security guard was killed and 20 people were wounded. ISIS claimed responsibility for the attack.

References

External links

Shamshad TV - Official website
Watch Shamshad TV Live
Shamshad TV of Afghanistan Joins AsiaSat 2 (pdf file)

Television stations in Afghanistan
Pashto mass media
Pashto-language television stations
2006 establishments in Afghanistan
Television channels and stations established in 2006